Lakeside Shopping Center, or simply Lakeside, is a shopping mall located at 3301 Veterans Memorial Boulevard in the New Orleans suburb of Metairie, Louisiana, United States. It opened on March 24, 1960 as the first regional shopping mall in New Orleans and is the largest and busiest mall in Greater New Orleans. Lakeside is a  mall with four major retail anchors (Dillard's, Macy's, JCPenney, and Zara). There are also more than 120 stores and restaurants. Lakeside once operated a 5-screen movie theater in a satellite complex near Dillard's but competition from newer stadium style theaters forced its closure and its eventual demolition for additional satellite retail space in 2000. That mall greatly expanded its food court and added 12 screens with stadium style seating in 2001.

History
The Mall Opened in 1960 as an open air center with anchors, D. H. Holmes, JCPenney, and Godchaux's. The mall expanded to an enclosed mall in 1969. In the 70s JCPenney was expanded to a new 2 level location with is still operating today. The old JCPenney was gutted for more stores, and the Mall turned into one of the biggest in the state. D. H. Holmes became Dillard's in 1989, and a new Food Court was added soon after. Another expansion soon happened with A new Macy's and a New Parking Garage were added. Macy's opened in 2008. And the latest expansion happened when the renovation of the Food Court and the opening of Zara (retailer).

Anchors
Dillard's (270,000 SF)(original anchor)
Macy's (228,000 SF)
JCPenney (154,700 SF)(original anchor)
Zara (retailer) (34,700 SF)
Apple Store (since 2008 highest revenue per sq.ft)

Former anchors
 Linens N Things

Satellite
Dick's Sporting Goods
 LOFT, a division of Ann Taylor (clothing retailer)

Hurricane Katrina

The mall suffered only minor damage from Hurricane Katrina.

References

External links
Official website

Shopping malls in Louisiana
Shopping malls established in 1960
Buildings and structures in Jefferson Parish, Louisiana
Tourist attractions in Jefferson Parish, Louisiana
Shopping malls in the New Orleans metropolitan area
1960 establishments in Louisiana